Lainey Denay Wilson (born May 19, 1992) is an American country music singer–songwriter. Wilson performed from an early age, before going to Nashville, Tennessee, to pursue a career as a country performer. In 2014, she released her first album, followed by a second on the Lone Chief label in 2016. Wilson secured a publishing deal and later released an extended play (EP) in 2019, which included the song "Things a Man Oughta Know". In 2020, it was issued as a single through the BBR Music Group and eventually reached number one on the American country songs chart.

Early life
Wilson was raised in Baskin, Louisiana, a town of only 250 people. Her father Brian was a farmer while her mother Michelle was a schoolteacher. She became interested in music at a young age. Her family often listened to classic country music by Buck Owens and Glen Campbell. "Country music for me and my family, it was more than music. We lived the words to those songs," she told The Advocate. At age nine, she attended a performance of the Grand Ole Opry and was drawn to the music. "I just remember looking up there, being like, ‘Man, I wanna do that'," she recalled. Wilson's father taught her a couple of chords and she was soon writing songs by her preteen years. In 2006, she released an extended play (EP) on Myspace titled Country Girls Rule. In high school, Wilson took a job impersonating Hannah Montana. Often booking her own shows, she performed as Hannah Montana at birthday parties, fairs, and festivals across Louisiana, Mississippi, and Arkansas, even once performing for child cancer patients at St. Jude Children's Research Hospital.

Career

2011–2018: Early years in Nashville and independent releases
Wilson finished high school and moved to Nashville, Tennessee in August 2011. She first lived in a camper trailer outside of a recording studio in Nashville. The studio owner paid for Wilson's water and electricity to help make ends meet. In 2021, Wilson explained that her early years in Nashville were difficult: "It taught me that this thing was not going to be easy. It taught me perseverance." For several years, Wilson played a variety of small shows and worked on her songwriting. In 2014, Wilson released a self-titled album on the Cupit label. It was followed in 2016  by her second album Tougher. The disc was released on the Lone Chief label. The project garnered an audience and charted the Billboard Top Country Albums list in 2016. In 2018, she issued her second EP, a self-titled collection that was self-released. This led to Wilson signing a publishing deal with SONY/ATV in 2018. The same year, she also signed a management deal.

2019–present: Breakout success with "Things a Man Oughta Know"
In 2018, Wilson signed a major-label recording contract with the BBR Music Group. Her first major-label release was her third EP Redneck Hollywood (2019). Her debut major label single was also released in 2019 called "Dirty Looks". Off the Record UK praised the EP, highlighting Wilson's songwriting and the production from producer Jay Joyce. The publication concluded by saying, "The EP is raw and real, pushing the country music genre wider than ever and bringing it back to the traditional while still reinventing it to its modern surroundings." Wilson then received attention from Country Music Television, who included her in their "Listen Up" Class of 2019 and on their "2019 CMT Next Women of Country" tour. She also toured with Morgan Wallen in 2019. During this same period, several of her songs were featured in the Paramount Network show Yellowstone.

In August 2020, the BBR label issued Wilson's next single to radio titled "Things a Man Oughta Know". The track gained heavy media attention from sites like Apple Music, iHeart Radio, Spotify and Pandora. By 2021, "Things a Man Oughta Know" became her breakout single, reaching number one on the Billboard Country Airplay chart and number three on the Country Songs chart. It was included on her third studio album Sayin' What I'm Thinkin' (2021). The disc was her first full-length album collection issued on the BBR label and contained 12 tracks. It was her second to reach the Billboard country albums list, peaking at number 40. The disc received positive reviews. "Beyond writing and recording songs that satisfy country music fans, she succeeds at introducing her whole self through the music," concluded Taste of Countrys Billy Dukes. Entertainment Focus commented, "The rising star knocks it out of the park with her new album."

Wilson appeared as a supporting act on Jason Aldean's "Back in the Saddle Tour" in 2021. In 2021, Wilson collaborated with Cole Swindell on his single "Never Say Never". The duet was released as the second single from Swindell's fourth studio album Stereotype, and became Wilson's second single to top the Billboard country chart. It was followed by her 2022 solo single titled "Heart Like a Truck", then the album Bell Bottom Country. Wilson received a leading six nominations at the 56th Annual Country Music Association Awards, becoming the fourth artist to receive six or more nominations as a first-time nominee. Wilson also joined the cast of Yellowstone in 2022.

Musical style and influences
Wilson's musical style is rooted in country music, but also incorporates elements of pop, southern rock, contemporary country and classic country. In describing her style, AllMusic's Mark Deming commented, "Wilson's voice is clear and strong, with an unapologetic Southern accent, and her songs are tough but heartfelt contemporary country with an edge that has its roots in vintage Southern rock and classic rock, as well as a dash of modern-day pop." In describing her own musical style, Wilson characterized it as "bell-bottom country", which Taste of Country called "a cross between easy listening and hard truths." Wilson has been heavily influenced by Dolly Parton, paying tribute to her in the self-composed track "WWDD" (What Would Dolly Do). She also credits Lee Ann Womack as an influence on her career and music.

DiscographyStudio albums'''
 Lainey Wilson (2014)
 Tougher (2016)
 Sayin' What I'm Thinkin' (2021)
 Bell Bottom Country (2022)

Filmography

Awards and nominations

!
|-
| rowspan="3"| 2021
| CMT Music Awards
| Breakthrough Video of the Year – "Things a Man Oughta Know"
| 
| align="center"| 
|-
| rowspan="2"| Academy of Country Music Awards
| New Female Artist of the Year
| 
| align="center" rowspan="2"| 
|-
| Song of the Year – "Things a Man Oughta Know"
| 
|-
| rowspan="8"| 2022
| rowspan="2"| CMT Music Awards
| CMT Digital – First Performance of the Year – "Things a Man Oughta Know"
| 
| align="center" rowspan="2"| 
|-
| Video of the Year – "Never Say Never" 
| 
|-
| rowspan=6| Country Music Association Awards
| Female Vocalist of the Year
| 
| align="center" rowspan="6"|
|-
| New Artist of the Year
| 
|-
| Album of the Year – Sayin' What I'm Thinkin'''
| 
|-
| Song of the Year – "Things a Man Oughta Know"
| 
|-
| Musical Event of the Year – "Never Say Never" 
| 
|-
| Video of the Year – "Never Say Never" 
| 
|}

References

External links
 Official website

1992 births
21st-century American women
American country singer-songwriters
American women country singers
BBR Music Group artists
Country musicians from Louisiana
Living people
People from Louisiana
Singer-songwriters from Louisiana